Louis Thomaturgé (born 25 November 1878, date of death unknown) was a French rower. He competed in the men's coxed four event at the 1912 Summer Olympics.

References

1878 births
Year of death missing
French male rowers
Olympic rowers of France
Rowers at the 1912 Summer Olympics
People from Saint-Pierre, Martinique